The Beverly Hills Financial Center is a landmark building in Beverly Hills, California.

Location
It is located at 9401 on Wilshire Boulevard in the City of Beverly Hills, California.

History
Completed in 1972, it was designed by architect Howard Lane in the modernist architectural style. Its facade is white. It is 42.67 metre high, with twelve floors.  It is the third tallest building in Beverly Hills after the Beverly Wilshire Hotel and the Bank of America Building.

It was renovated in 1999.

References

Buildings and structures in Beverly Hills, California
Office buildings completed in 1972
Modernist architecture in California